Beotigogae Station is a subway station on the Seoul Subway Line 6 in Jung-gu. This station was built deep underground because this area is located near Namsan and is quite hilly.

The station's name comes from the nearby Beoti Pass, which according to legend got its name after soldiers chasing a thief through the pass from Hannam-dong to Yaksu-dong in the Joseon period, shouting beondo (번도, thief), and the word beondo later became beonti and then beoti.

Station layout

Vicinity
Exit 1 : Yaksu Police Station, Tower Hotel
Exit 2 : Songdo Hospital
Exit 3 : Namsan Town APT

References 

Seoul Metropolitan Subway stations
Metro stations in Jung District, Seoul
Railway stations opened in 2001